Lapin Kansa is a morning newspaper published in Lapland, Finland.

History and profile
Lapin Kansa was established in 1928. The newspaper is based in Rovaniemi. The owner of the paper is Alma Media. In June 2013 Kaleva publishing house began to publish the daily together with the group's other newspaper Pohjolan Sanomat.

Heikki Tuomi-Nikula is among the former editors-in-chief of the paper. On 1 October 2008 Johanna Korhonen was appointed the editor-in-chief. However, she was fired immediately after her appointment due to the fact that she was a lesbian. Antti Kokkonen replaced her in the post.

In January 2011 the daily changed its format from broadsheet to tabloid. Since 2011 Lapin Kansa has published news and reports in North Sami language in addition to those in Finnish.

In 2013 Lapin Kansa had a circulation of 28,992 copies.

References

External links
Official Lapin Kansa site

1928 establishments in Finland
Finnish-language newspapers
Mass media in Rovaniemi
Daily newspapers published in Finland
Publications established in 1928